Restaurant magazine is a British magazine aimed at chefs, restaurant proprietors and other catering professionals that covers the breadth of the UK restaurant industry.

History and profile
Restaurant was founded in 2001. The magazine is published monthly by William Reed Business Media and had a circulation of 16,642 in December 2011.

It produces an annual list of what it considers to be the best 50 restaurants in the world, based on the votes of 837 "chefs, restaurateurs, critics and fun-loving gourmands".

See also
 List of food and drink magazines

References

External links
Official site

2001 establishments in the United Kingdom
Business magazines published in the United Kingdom
Monthly magazines published in the United Kingdom
Food and drink magazines
Magazines published in London
Magazines established in 2001